ARDE can refer to:

 Democratic Revolutionary Alliance, (Alianza Revolucionaria Democrática), a Contra group of the Southern Front guerrillas in Nicaragua that fought against the Marxist elements of the original Sandinista revolution in 1979
 Armament Research and Development Establishment, An Indian national defense laboratory under DRDO, located in Pune
 UK Armament Research and Development Establishment, created in 1955 and renamed Royal Armament Research and Development Establishment (RARDE) in 1962
 The Aspect Ratio Dependent Etching effect found in Deep reactive-ion etching.